Grant or Grants may refer to:

Places
Grant County (disambiguation)

Australia 

 Grant, Queensland, a locality in the Barcaldine Region, Queensland, Australia

United Kingdom
Castle Grant

United States
Grant, Alabama
Grant, Inyo County, California
Grant, Colorado
Grant-Valkaria, Florida
Grant, Iowa
Grant, Michigan 
Grant, Minnesota
Grant, Nebraska
Grant, Ohio, an unincorporated community
Grant, Washington
Grant, Wisconsin (disambiguation) (six towns)
Grant City, Indiana
Grant City, Missouri
Grant City, Staten Island
Grant Lake (disambiguation), several lakes
Grant Park, Illinois
Grant Park (Chicago) 
Grant Town, West Virginia
Grant Township (disambiguation) (100 townships in 12 states)
Grant Village in Yellowstone National Park
Grants, New Mexico
Grants Pass, Oregon
U.S. Grant Bridge over Ohio River and Scioto River
General Grant National Memorial aka Grant's Tomb

India
Jolly Grant Airport Dehradun, Uttarakhand

Canada
Rural Municipality of Grant No. 372, Saskatchewan

People
 Grant (given name), including a list of people and fictional characters
 Grant (surname), including a list of people and fictional characters

 Ulysses S. Grant (1822–1885), the 18th president of the United States and general of the Union during the American Civil War
 Cary Grant (1904–1986), British-American actor
 Hugh Grant (born 1960), British actor
 Richard E. Grant (born 1957), British-Swazi actor
 Justice Grant (disambiguation), judges named Grant
 Clan Grant, a Highland Scottish clan

Art, entertainment, and media
Grant (book), a 2017 biography of Ulysses S. Grant by Ron Chernow
Grant (miniseries), a 2020 miniseries based on the Chernow book
"Grant", a poem by Patti Smith from her 1978 book Babel

Businesses 
Donald M. Grant, Publisher, Inc., a fantasy and science fiction small press publisher in New Hampshire 
W. T. Grant variety store, a chain of mass-merchandise stores
William Grant & Sons, a Scotch whisky distilling company

Law and philanthropy 
Grant (law), a term in conveyancing
Grant (money), an award usually funded by a government, business, or foundation, often with not-for-profit preconditions
 Spanish and Mexican land grants in New Mexico
 Spanish land grants in Florida
Grant v Torstar Corp, a leading Supreme Court of Canada case on responsible communication in the public interest as a defence against defamation

Vehicles and transportation 
Grant (automobile), a defunct Findlay, Ohio auto manufacturer
M3 Lee, an American tank, a modified version was called the Grant
, several ships of the U.S. Navy

Other uses
Grant, colloquial term for a United States fifty-dollar bill which bears a portrait of President Ulysses S. Grant
Cyclone Grant, a tropical cyclone that made landfall near Darwin, Australia, in late-December 2011
Grant of arms in nobility

See also 

 
 
 
 General Grant (disambiguation)
 Justice Grant (disambiguation)
 President Grant (disambiguation)
 Grant Thornton (disambiguation)